Local council may refer to:

Political subdivision
 Local council (Israel)
 Local council (Jordan)
 Local councils of Malta
 An elected authority in the local government in the United Kingdom
 An elected authority in the local government in Australia
 Local Council (Uganda), a form of local elected government within the districts of Uganda
 Local municipality (South Africa)
 Parsissaet, former local councils in colonial Greenland

Religious
 Local Council of the Russian Orthodox Church
 In the Eastern Orthodox Church, a local council is a historical synod (council of bishops)

Other
 Boy Scouts of America Local Councils
 Local School Councils, a council in every public school in Chicago, USA

See also
 Local government